Diwan Bahadur Chinna Seevaram Ratnasabhapathy Mudaliar OBE was an Indian industrialist and politician who served as a member of the Madras Legislative Council from 1926 to 1936. His family hails from Seevaram village near Cheyyar of North Arcot district.

Personal life 

Ratnasabhapathy Mudaliar was born on 9 March 1886, into a wealthy Tuluva Vellalar mudaliar family in business at Coimbatore.

Career 
He was educated at Coimbatore and served as a member of the Coimbatore Municipal Council from 1906 to 1926 serving as its Chairman from 1921 to 1936.

Ratnasabhapathy Mudaliar was an active Indian independence activist and collected funds for V. O. Chidambaram Pillai's Swadeshi Steam Navigation Company.

Awards and Titles

He was awarded the Dewan Bahadur title, in honour of his contributions to the city and the country.

He was also appointed an Officer of the Order of the British Empire.

Legacy

A key area in Coimbatore city R.S. Puram is named after him for his contributions to the city. A street in also named after him as DB road (Dewan Bahadur).

References

Sources

 

Members of the Tamil Nadu Legislative Council
People from Coimbatore
Indian independence activists from Tamil Nadu
Dewan Bahadurs
1886 births
1956 deaths
Indian Officers of the Order of the British Empire